Robert Kuhn may refer to:

Robert Lawrence Kuhn (born 1944), American author, investment banker, China specialist, television host
Robert T. Kuhn (born 1937), American clergyman, president of the Lutheran Church - Missouri Synod